Southeast Fuller Road is a light rail station on TriMet's MAX Green Line in Portland, Oregon, located between SE 82nd Avenue and Interstate 205.  It is the 7th stop southbound on the Interstate 205 MAX branch. The station has a center platform and is surrounded by a park and ride facility.

A month before the station went into service, Clackamas County land use planners went public with a proposal to make the area surrounding the station subject to a type of zoning that would be new to the county, one based on a form-based code.  Planners think such a change would promote transit-oriented development and a "denser, more vibrant mix of uses in the area", which is currently dominated by surface parking and big-box stores.  The station is on the eastern edge of the county's North Clackamas Revitalization Area, an urban renewal district established in 2006.

Bus line connections
This station has no bus connections.

References

External links
Station information (with northbound ID number) from TriMet
Station information (with southbound ID number) from TriMet
MAX Light Rail Stations – more general TriMet page

2009 establishments in Oregon
MAX Green Line
MAX Light Rail stations
Railway stations in the United States opened in 2009
Railway stations in Clackamas County, Oregon